The Merseyrail Northern line is a cross-city railway running from  in south Liverpool then (by way of an underground section through Liverpool's city centre) to termini in the north at  (Merseyside),  (Lancashire) and  (Merseyside). It and the Wirral Line are commuter rail services operated by Merseyrail, serving Merseyside. A third line, the City Line, is not owned or operated by Merseyrail, although stations inside Merseytravel's area are branded as Merseyrail. All three lines are funded by Merseytravel.

Passenger interchange to the Wirral Line is available at Moorfields and Liverpool Central, and to the City Line at Hunts Cross and Liverpool South Parkway. Liverpool South Parkway also allows interchange with regional and long-distance services, while connections to services operated by Northern Trains are possible at Kirkby, Ormskirk and Southport.

Description 

The line runs from Hunts Cross in the south of Liverpool towards Liverpool Central. In the tunnel just south of Liverpool Central, the line drops into a 1970s tunnel to a lower level into the underground Mersey Railway Liverpool Central (Low Level) station. North of Central the line uses the Mersey Railway tunnel for about half of the route to Moorfields, an underground station built in the 1970s to replace the surface-level Liverpool Exchange. North of Moorfields, the route emerges from the tunnel to join the Lancashire and Yorkshire Railway lines from the former Exchange station.

After Sandhills, the former Liverpool, Crosby and Southport Railway branches off towards Southport, while the other routes continue to Kirkdale on what was a joint section of track between Liverpool, Ormskirk and Preston Railway and the Liverpool and Bury Railway. After Kirkdale, the Ormskirk and Kirkby lines diverge.

Generally, trains from Hunts Cross continue to Southport, while trains to Ormskirk and Kirkby start at Liverpool Central. Daytime trains operate every 15minutes on each of the three routes Monday to Saturday daytime and every 30minutes evenings and Sundays. Until 2017, summer Sunday frequencies on the Southport route were increased to every 15minutes. There are no peak hour frequency increases but trains on the Southport and Ormskirk routes are increased to six carriages, as are weekend services during the summer on the Southport route.

Special timetables are implemented for major events such as the Grand National meeting at Aintree and golf tournaments at Birkdale. These involve changing services on all branches and the closure of stations in anticipation of overcrowding risks.

Passenger volume
Passengers from the year beginning April 2002 to the year beginning April 2010.

Service pattern 
There are a total of 12 trains per hour (tph) running on the central section between Sandhills and Liverpool Central. The service pattern is: (Not all stops listed; trains call at every station on their route.)

History 

The Northern Line was introduced in 1977.

In 2006, Garston station was replaced by Liverpool South Parkway station.

Electrification 
The line is electrified using , identical to the third rail system present in southern England.

 Liverpool Exchange to Southport, Crossens and Meols Cop was the first section to be electrified, in 1904.
 The branch to Aintree, on the Ormskirk branch, followed in 1906, extended to Ormskirk in 1913.
 The Kirkby branch and the line south to Garston were electrified to create a north–south line through the Link Tunnel in 1978.
 Electrification was cut back to Southport in the north in 1964 as part of the Southport-Preston line closure, stations closing which previously had had electric services were St Lukes, Hesketh Park, Churchtown, and Crossens, electric services also ceased to Meols Cop station although the conductor rail remained until 1970 to serve the large depot at Meols Cop, and this station continues to serve trains on the Southport to Wigan/Manchester line.
 Garston to Hunts Cross was electrified in 1983.

Connections 

As the Northern line does not pass through , passengers from other rail networks must use the Wirral line as a connection. As there is only a direct escalator down to the Wirral line towards Birkenhead at Liverpool Central and given the short distance between Central and Lime Street most passengers prefer to walk rather than use the several escalators necessary to travel between the two stations.

Liverpool city centre stations have lifts for wheelchairs buggies and heavy luggage but they are small.

Interchange with other National Rail services can be made at Southport, Ormskirk, Kirkby, Liverpool South Parkway and Hunts Cross.

Future
Plans to re-open St James station have been proposed. Merseytravel agreed to work with Liverpool Vision in March 2014 to investigate the cost of re-opening the station and its projected usage. Merseytravel listed the re-opening of St James station as a 'top rail project' on a Rail Development and Delivery Committee report in 2016.

As part of Lancashire County Council's plans to build a new railway station in Skelmersdale, they have proposed an extension to the Northern Line that would change the terminus of the Kirkby branch of the line from Kirkby to Skelmersdale. The proposals could see a new station built at Headbolt Lane and Merseyrail services also passing through Rainford railway station. By September 2017, Merseytravel and Lancashire County Council had committed £5million of funding to the scheme. Merseytravel believe the scheme could cost around £300million to develop and could be ready in a decade.

Liverpool City Region Combined Authority, Long Term Rail Strategy document of October 2017, page 37, states a review in 2020 to introduce new Merseyrail battery trains will be undertaken, in view to put Preston onto the Merseyrail network by extending the Merseyrail Northern Line from Ormskirk to Preston. The aim is to have Preston one of the terminals of the Northern Line. The document states, "The potential use of battery powered Merseyrail units may improve the business case".

See also

LYR electric units
A59 road, which follows the same route.

References

External links 

Rail transport in Liverpool
Railway lines in North West England
Standard gauge railways in England
Rail transport in Merseyside